Van is the surname of:

Jessika Van, American actress
Lindsey Van (born 1984), American ski jumper
Marina de Van (born 1971), French film director, screenwriter and actress
Tomiko Van (born 1979), Japanese singer and actress
Wally Van (1880–1974), American actor and film director of the silent era

See also
Van (disambiguation)